Pardosa hyperborea is a species of wolf spiders in the family Lycosidae. It is found in North America, Greenland, Europe, and Russia (European to Sibiria).

References

Further reading

 NCBI Taxonomy Browser, Pardosa hyperborea

hyperborea
Spiders described in 1872